Moglicë is a village and a former municipality in the Korçë County, southeastern Albania. At the 2015 local government reform it became a subdivision of the municipality Maliq. The population at the 2011 census was 951. The municipal unit consists of the villages Moglicë, Gopesh, Dobërçan, Maliq-Opar, Gurkuq, Bardhas, Zerec, Dushar, Torovec, Shpatmal, Peshtan, Lumaj, Protopapë, Osojë, Gurshqipe, Kucakë and Nikollarë.

The works for the Moglicë dam in the river Devoll and the road to it concentrate almost 400 workers close to the village, that has 1 small market and at least 2 bars.

References

Former municipalities in Korçë County
Administrative units of Maliq
Villages in Korçë County